Enno Louis of East Frisia, was count of East Frisia and after 1654 Fürst (Prince) of East Frisia, (29 October 1632 – Aurich, 4 April 1660) and the son of Ulrich II and Juliana of Hesse-Darmstadt.

Life

Enno Louis grew up in the Netherlands, France and Switzerland and had an expensive education. At the age of 19 he was appointed Reichshofrat on the court of emperor Ferdinand III. With this the emperor recognised his maturity and governing skills. So he could push aside his mother Juliana of Hesse-Darmstadt and her advisers from the government. In 1651 he became count of East Frisia. Quickly after this he tried and executed the favourite and lover of his mother, the geheimrat Johann von Marenholz. He was executed in Wittmund on July 21, 1651.

He attempted to become Reichsfürst (Prince) and with the help of the East Frisian scholar Hermann Conring and 15,000 guiders he succeeded in this goal in 1654. Although only for himself and without a seat in the Reichstag. His brother George Christian who succeeded him managed to obtain the hereditary title. He was engaged with Henriette Catherine of Nassau but eventually married in 1656 with Juliana Sophia of Barby-Mühlingen. With her he had two daughters, Juliane Louise and Sophie Wilhelmine, who became the third wife of Christian Ulrich I, Duke of Württemberg-Oels. He died in 1660 after a hunting accident. Because he had only daughters he was succeeded by his brother.

Ancestors

Literature 
 Tielke, Martin (ed.): Biographisches Lexikon für Ostfriesland, Bd. 1  (1993), Bd. 2  (1997), Bd. 3  (2001) Ostfries. Landschaftliche Verl.- u. Vertriebsges. Aurich
 Ernst Kaeber: Bilder aus dem Leben ostfries. Fürstlichkeiten des 17. Jahrhunderts. I. Die jüngeren Brüder des Fürsten Enno Ludwig. II. Aus dem Leben des Fürsten Christian Eberhard, Aurich, 1912
 Ernst Kaeber: Die Jugendzeit Fürst Enno Ludwigs von Ostfriesland, Aurich, 1911

1632 births
1660 deaths
Counts of East Frisia
Princes of East Frisia